Serafim is a masculine given name. Notable people with the name include:

 Serafim Baptista (1925–2001), Portuguese footballer
 Serafim Barzakov (born 1975), Bulgarian wrestler
 Serafim Cojocari (born 2001), Moldovan footballer
 Serafim Fernandes de Araújo (1924–2019), Brazilian Roman Catholic archbishop
 Serafim Karalexis (21st century), British film producer
 Serafim Kolpakov (1933–2011), Soviet engineer and politician
 Serafim Neves (1920–1989), Portuguese footballer
 Serafim Pereira (1943–1994), Portuguese footballer
 Serafim Saca (1935–2011), Moldovan writer
 Serafim Todorov (born 1969), Bulgarian-Georgian boxer
 Serafim Tulikov (1914–2004), Russian composer
 Serafim Urechean (born 1950), Moldovan politician

Masculine given names